The Constituent Assembly of Pakistan was established in August 1947 to frame a constitution for Pakistan. It also served as its first interim parliament. It was dissolved by the Governor-General of Pakistan in 1954.

First Session 
The members were originally elected to the Constituent Assembly of undivided India before they abdicated in the aftermath of the Partition of India. The members were as follows: 

{|class="wikitable"
! Province !! Members
|-
! East Bengal
| Abdullah al Mahmood, Maulana Mohammad Abdullah el Baqui, Abdul Hamid, Abdul Kasem Khan, Mohammad Akram Khan, Azizuddin Ahmad, Muhammad Habibullah Bahar, Prem Hari Barma, Raj Kumar Chakraverty, Sris Chandra Chattopadhyaya, Abdul Matin Chaudhary, Murtaza Raza Choudhry, Hamidul Haq Chowdhury, Akhay Kumar Das, Dhirendra Nath Datta, Bhupendra Kumar Datta, Ebrahim Khan, Fazlul Huq, Fazlur Rahman, Ghayasuddin Pathan, Begum Shaista Suhrawardy Ikramullah, Liaquat Ali Khan, Mafizuddin Ahmad, Mahmud Hussain, Jnanendra Chandra Majumdar, A. M. Malik, Birat Chandra Mandal, Jogendra Nath Mandal, Mohammed Ali, Khwaja Nazimuddin, M.A.B.L. Nur Ahmed, Nurul Amin, Ishtiaq Hussain Qureshi, Sri Dhananjoy, B.L. Roy, Maudi Bhakesh Chanda, B.L. Serajul Islam, Maulana Shabbir Ahmad Osmani, Shahabudin Khwaja, H.S. Suhrawardy, Harendra Kumar Sur, Tamizuddin Khan, Kawivi Kerwar Datta, Ghulam Mohammed
|-
! West Punjab
| Mumtaz Daultana, Ganga Saran, Zafarullah Khan, Iftikhar Hussain Khan, Mian Muhammad Iftikharuddin, Muhammad Ali Jinnah, Sheikh Karamat Ali, Nazir Ahmad Khan, Sardar Abdur Rab Nistar, Feroz Khan Noon, Omar Hayat Malik, Shah Nawaz Begum Jahan Ara, Sardar Shaukat Hyat Khan,
|-
! style="width: 50px;"| Northwest Frontier Province
| Khan Abdul Ghaffar Khan, Sardar Bahadur Khan, Sardar Asad Ullah Jan Khan
|-
! Sindh
| Abdus Sattar Abdur Rahman, Muhammad Hashim Gazdar, Muhammad Ayoob Khuhro
|-
!Balochistan':
| Nawab Mohammad Khan Jogezai
|}

Pakistan's Constituent Assembly first convened on August 10, 1947, on the eve of independence and the end of British rule. Muhammad Ali Jinnah was elected as the president of the Constituent Assembly of Pakistan on the same day and remained its president until his death on September 11, 1948. Subsequently, Liaquat Ali Khan headed it for three years and produced the Objectives Resolution, which was adopted by the Constituent Assembly on March 12, 1949, as an annex to Pakistan's constitution. It is important to mention that 21 members out of 69 voted for the Objectives Resolution. The assembly had a majority of Muslim League members, with the Pakistan National Congress, the successor to the INC in the state, forming the second largest party. 

The assembly was widely criticised for its incompetence. Addressing a rally in Lahore on October 14, 1950, Maulana Maududi demanded its dissolution, arguing that the "lampost legislators" were incapable of drawing up an Islamic constitution. Huseyn Shaheed Suhrawardy said that assembly did not possess any of the characteristics of a democratic parliament. He argued that the nation would overlook any unconstitutional action on the governor general's part if he exorcised the fascist demon and established representative institutions.
The Constituent Assembly of Pakistan was dissolved on October 24, 1954, by Governor General Malik Ghulam Muhammad. The dissolution was challenged by the president of the assembly in the notable case of Federation of Pakistan v. Maulvi Tamizuddin Khan'', in which the federal court took the side of the governor general, in spite of dissent from one judge. Mohammad Ali Bogra was the Prime Minister of Pakistan at the time.

Second Session 
The second Constituent Assembly reconstituted on May 28, 1955. The constitution was promulgated on March 23, 1956, making Pakistan an Islamic republic. On October 7, 1958, martial law was imposed on the country by Iskander Mirza, with army chief Ayub Khan appointed as the chief martial law administrator. The new leaders abrogated the constitution, declaring it unworkable.

After coming to power, Zulfikar Ali Bhutto invited the leaders of the parliamentary parties to meet him on October 17, 1972, which led to an agreement known as the 'constitutional accord', which was reached after intensive talks. As per consultations floated by the PPP, the National Assembly of Pakistan appointed a 25-member committee led by Mahmud Ali Kasuri on April 17, 1972, to prepare a draft of a permanent constitution for Pakistan. On October 20, 1972, the draft bill for the constitution was signed by leaders of all parliamentary groups in the National Assembly. A bill to provide a constitution for the Islamic Republic of Pakistan was introduced in the assembly on February 2, 1973. The assembly passed the bill nearly unanimously on April 10, 1973, and it was endorsed by the acting President Zulfikar Ali Bhutto on April 12, 1973. The constitution came into effect on August 14, 1973. On the same day, Bhutto took over as the prime minister and Choudhary Fazal-e-Elahi as the president, both for a 5-year term. On July 5, 1977, General Zia staged a military coup, suspended the constitution (which was later restored in 1985), and declared martial law. Similarly, when General Musharraf took over in 1999, the constitution was suspended for several years and the parliament was dissolved.

See also
Constituent assembly
National Assembly of Pakistan

References

External links
History of Pakistan's National Assembly

 
Parliament of Pakistan
Pakistan Movement
Constitution of Pakistan
Government of Pakistan